Miha Marinko (8 September 1900 – 19 August 1983) was a Slovenian revolutionary and communist statesman who served as Prime Minister of Slovenia from June 1946 to 1953. During the latter part of 1953, he served as the president of the executive council, in the same role as prime minister. He succeeded Boris Kidrič and was succeeded by Boris Kraigher. He was a member of the League of Communists of Slovenia.

References 

Prime Ministers of Slovenia
1900 births
1983 deaths
Recipients of the Order of the People's Hero